The 1983 Gael Linn Cup, the most important representative competition for elite level participants in the women's team field sport of camogie, was won by Leinster, who defeated Munster in the final, played at Ballinlough.

Arrangements
Leinster defeated Connacht by 5–8 to 1–2 at Mobhi Road. Joan Gormley then scored a goal in the dying seconds of the final against Munster at Ballinlough to win by 2–7 to 1–7. Angela Downey scrambled Leinster's first goal in a goalmouth melee in the first half and Tipeprary's Deirdre Lane had a goal for Munster in the opening minutes.

Gael Linn Trophy
In the Gael Linn Cup trophy Ulster defeated Munster at Ballymacward by 2–12 to 3–5., Leinster defeated Connacht 4–6 to 1–4 at Mobhi Road. The sides were level on 12 occasions in the final and the match went into extra time before Munster won by 1–12 to 1–11.

Final stages

Junior final

References

External links
 Camogie Association

1983 in camogie
1983